The oriole warbler (Hypergerus atriceps) is a large warbler in the family Cisticolidae, and the only member of the genus Hypergerus. This bird is a resident breeder in west Africa from southern Senegal to Cameroon.

This skulking passerine is typically found in dense thickets usually near water. The oriole warbler builds a large untidy nest suspended from palm leaves.

These 20-cm long warblers have a long tail, strong legs and a long black bill. At a weight of around  the oriole warbler may be the largest of the species-rich Cisticolidae family. Adults are light olive above, yellow below and have a black hood. The species' name refers to their resemblance to the unrelated but similarly black and yellow orioles. The sexes are similar, but juveniles are duller.

Like most warblers, the oriole warbler is insectivorous. The song is a loud whistled duetted toooo-ooo-eee-oooo, oooo-ooo-eee-oooo. The male always leads the duet and the female answers, though this is done in a manner that is temporarily rather loose.

References

 Birds of The Gambia by Barlow, Wacher and Disley, 
Ryan, Peter (2006). Family Cisticolidae (Cisticolas and allies). pp. 378–492 in del Hoyo J., Elliott A. & Christie D.A. (2006) Handbook of the Birds of the World. Volume 11. Old World Flycatchers to Old World Warblers Lynx Edicions, Barcelona 
 Nguembock B.; Fjeldsa J.; Tillier A.; Pasquet E. (2007): A phylogeny for the Cisticolidae (Aves: Passeriformes) based on nuclear and mitochondrial DNA sequence data, and a re-interpretation of a unique nest-building specialization. Molecular Phylogenetics and Evolution 42: 272–286.

oriole warbler
Birds of West Africa
oriole warbler
Taxa named by René Lesson